Arthur N. Neu Airport  is a public airport five miles southeast of Carroll, in Carroll County, Iowa. Also known as Arthur N. Neu Municipal Airport, it was established at its current location in the 1940s.

Facilities
It has two lighted runways: Runway 13/31 is 5,506 by 100 feet (1,676 x 30 m) with instrument approach and non-directional beacon. Runway 3/21 is 3,301 by 60 feet (1,006 x 18 m).

In the year ending August 20, 2017, the airport had 7,700 aircraft operations, average 21 per day: 91% general aviation, 8% air taxi and <1% military. In January 2017, 16 aircraft were based at the airport: 11 single-engine, 
4 multi-engine and 1 ultralight. The airport has hangar space for 24 aircraft.

References

External links 
 Carroll Municipal - Arthur N. Neu (CIN) at Iowa DOT Airport Directory
 

Airports in Iowa
Transportation buildings and structures in Carroll County, Iowa
Carroll, Iowa